Lijin County is a county of Shandong province, People's Republic of China, situated on the northwestern (left) bank of the Yellow River. It is under the administration of Dongying City.

The population in 1999 was 289 593.

Administrative divisions
As 2012, this county is divided to 5 towns and 4 townships.
Towns

Townships

Climate

References 

 
Counties of Shandong
Dongying